The Meldola Medal and Prize was awarded annually from 1921 to 1979 by the Chemical Society and from 1980 to 2008 by the Royal Society of Chemistry to a British chemist who was under 32 years of age for promising original investigations in chemistry (which had been published). It commemorated Raphael Meldola, President of the Maccabaeans and the Institute of Chemistry. The prize was the sum of £500 and a bronze medal.

The prize was modified in 2008 and joined the Edward Harrison Memorial Prize to become the Harrison-Meldola Memorial Prizes.

Winners
Awardees include: 

 For 2009 onwards, see Harrison-Meldola Memorial Prizes

See also

 List of chemistry awards

References

Awards of the Royal Society of Chemistry
Awards established in 1921